Kevin Kouassivi-Benissan (born 25 January 1999) is a Finnish footballer who plays as a midfielder for Lahti on loan from HJK.

Early life 
Kouassivi-Benissan was born in Finland to Togolese parents. He has Togolese citizenship by birth and has obtained Finnish citizenship through naturalization.

Club career 
On 17 March 2022, Kouassivi-Benissan joined Lahti on loan for the 2022 season.

References

External links

1999 births
Finnish people of Togolese descent
Naturalized citizens of Finland
Living people
Finnish footballers
Association football midfielders
Finland youth international footballers
Finland under-21 international footballers
Helsingin Jalkapalloklubi players
Klubi 04 players
Rovaniemen Palloseura players
FC Inter Turku players
FC Lahti players
Veikkausliiga players
Kakkonen players
Ykkönen players